Nityanandapur is a village in Bhatar CD block in Bardhaman Sadar North subdivision of Purba Bardhaman district in the state of West Bengal, India with total 1,087 families residing.

History
Census 2011 Nityanandapur Village Location Code or Village Code 319828.The village of Nityanandapur is located in the Bhatar tehsil of Burdwan district in West Bengal, India.

Transport 
At around 27 kilometres (16 mi) from Purba Bardhaman, the journey to Nityanandapur from the town can be made by bus and nearest rail station bhatar.

Population 
Schedule Caste (SC) constitutes 19.71% while Schedule Tribe (ST) were 3.59% of total population in Nityanandapur village.

Population and house data

Healthcare
Nearest Rural Hospital at Bhatar (with 60 beds) is the main medical facility in Bhatar CD block. There are primary health centers..

References 

Villages in Purba Bardhaman district